Russian athletes competed as Neutral Paralympic Athletes at the 2018 Winter Paralympics in Pyeongchang, South Korea, held between 9–18 March 2018. The Russian Paralympic Committee remains suspended from the Paralympic movement since 2016, due to the state-sponsored doping programme scandal, but the International Paralympic Committee allowed athletes deemed clean to participate in five sports. They participated under the Paralympic flag, and the Paralympic anthem was used during ceremonies for those who won gold medals.

Medalists

| width="75%" align="left" valign="top" |

| width="25%" align=left valign="top" |

Competitors
The following is the list of number of competitors that could participate at the Games per sport/discipline.

Alpine skiing

Men

Women

Biathlon 

Women

Cross-country skiing

Women
Distance

Sprint

Relay

Snowboarding

Men
Snowboard cross

Banked slalom

Wheelchair curling

Summary

Robin round

Round-robin
Neutral Paralympic Athletes has a bye in draws 3, 5, 7, 10, 12 and 17.

Draw 1
Saturday, 10 March, 14:35

Draw 2
Saturday, 10 March, 14:35

Draw 4
Sunday, 11 March, 14:35

Draw 6
Monday, 12 March, 9:35

Draw 8
Monday, 12 March, 19:35

Draw 9
Tuesday, 13 March, 9:35

Draw 11
Tuesday, 13 March, 19:35

Draw 13
Wednesday, 14 March, 14:35

Draw 14
Wednesday, 14 March, 19:35

Draw 15
Thursday, 15 March, 9:35

Draw 16
Thursday, 15 March, 14:35

See also 
 Olympic Athletes from Russia at the 2018 Winter Olympics

References

External links
 PyeongChang Official website 
International Paralympic Committee PyeongChang website

Nations at the 2018 Winter Paralympics
2018
2018 in Russian sport
Independent Paralympians at the Paralympic Games
Doping in Russia
Paralympic Games controversies
Sanctions against Russia